The General Commander of the Navy is the professional head of the Peruvian Navy

List of officeholders

References

Peruvian Navy admirals
Navy chiefs of staff